In the Indonesian military, titular and honorary ranks are two different types of special military ranks. Unlike the normal rank in the Indonesian military, titular and honorary ranks could be given to civilians who served temporarily in the military or contributed to the military.

Titular rank

Background 
Titular rank have been given since the Indonesian National Revolution. During the revolution, the office of governors, residents, and regents were transformed into military offices, which allowed them to regulate military affairs in their region. In their capacity, they were given titular military ranks. Military governors were given the titular rank of general major, military residents were given the titular rank of lieutenant colonel, and military regents were given the titular rank of major.

Several military offices during the revolution also involve civilian officeholders. An example of this is the Army Political Education Staff and the Military Court. The Army Political Education Staff, which was intended to educate the military on non-military matters, consisted of civilians. As such, these civilians were given the titular rank of major general. Similarly, the military court during the revolution was filled with civilian judges due to the lack of military officers with law backgrounds. These civilian judges were given titular ranks, with the highest being the titular rank of lieutenant general for the chief justice of the supreme army court and the lowest being the titular rank of captain for the court clerk.

Regulation  
The first regulation on titular ranks was enacted on 1 August 1946 with the Government Decree No. 7 of 1946. The regulation specifies the use of titular ranks within the military courts. The decree was later amended with the enactment of Government Decree No. 45 of 1948 on 9 October 1948.

Regulations about special military ranks were later merged to the Government Decree No. 36 of 1959, which was enacted on 26 June 1959.

Current usage

Titular rank holders

Titular flag officers 
 Hamengkubuwono IX (titular general)
 Roeslan Abdulgani (titular general)
 Chairul Saleh (titular lieutenant general, later promoted to titular general on 17 August 1964, titular rank converted to honorary rank posthumously on 22 June 1967)
 Johannes Leimena (titular vice admiral, later promoted to titular admiral on 17 August 1964)
 Soebandrio (titular air vice admiral, later promoted to titular air admiral on 17 August 1964)
Daud Beureueh (titular general major)
Ferdinand Lumbantobing (titular general major)
Nugroho Notosusanto (titular brigadier general)

Titular officers 
 Melanchton Siregar (titular colonel)
 Idris Sardi (titular lieutenant colonel)
 Deddy Corbuzier (titular lieutenant colonel)

Honorary rank 
Honorary ranks are usually given as a promotion to retired military officers. Retired military officers who serve as ministers usually received honorary rank promotion.

Honorary rank holders 

 Chairul Saleh (honorary general)
Achmad Tahir (honorary general)
 Susilo Sudarman (honorary general)
 Agum Gumelar (honorary general)
 Luhut Binsar Pandjaitan (honorary general)
 Susilo Bambang Yudhoyono (honorary general)
 Hari Sabarno (honorary general)
 Abdullah Mahmud Hendropriyono (honorary general)
Azwar Anas (honorary lieutenant general)
Ary Mardjono (honorary lieutenant general)
Z.A. Maulani (honorary lieutenant general)
Kentot Harseno (honorary lieutenant general)
Sintong Panjaitan (honorary lieutenant general)
Paku Alam VIII (honorary major general)
Muchlis Ibrahim (honorary major general)
Bandjela Paliudju (honorary major general)
Daniel Frank Craig (honorary commander)

References 

Military ranks of Indonesia